The 2022 AFA Senior Male League was the 23rd season of the AFA Senior Male League, the men's football league in Anguilla. The regular season began on March 4 and concluded on June 19. The playoffs began on July 8 and concluded on July 24.

Roaring Lions won their 10th Anguillan league championship, and their third consecutive league title.

Teams

Stadiums and locations 
Note: Table lists in alphabetical order.

Arriving clubs 
 Eagle Claw

Departing clubs 
 Enforcers

Regular season

Table

Playoffs

Bracket

2022 AFA Champions League 
The 2022 AFA Champions League was held from August 12 to September 11. The top five finishers during the regular season competed in this league.

Table

2022 AFL Development League 
The 2022 AFL Development League was held from July 15 to August 20. The bottom six finishers during the regular season competed in this league.

Table

References

External links 
 2022 AFA Senior Male League at RSSSF

2022
2021–22 in Caribbean football leagues
2022–23 in Caribbean football leagues